Web Single Sign-On Interoperability Profile is a Web Services and Federated identity specification, published by Microsoft and Sun Microsystems that defines interoperability between WS-Federation and the Liberty Alliance protocols.

External links

See also 
List of Web service specifications
Web Single Sign-On Metadata Exchange Protocol
SAML
XACML
OpenID
WS-Federation

References 

Security